Siniolchu is one of the tallest mountains of the Indian state of Sikkim. The  mountain is considered to be particularly aesthetically attractive, having been described by Douglas Freshfield as "the most superb triumph of mountain architecture and the most beautiful snow mountain in the world". It is situated near the green lake adjacent to Kangchenjunga.

Climbing history 
Siniolchu's summit was first scaled in 1936 by the German climbers Karl Wien and Adi Göttner. Later Sikkimese Everest climber Sonam Gyatso also scaled the top.

References

Mountains of Sikkim
Six-thousanders of the Himalayas